Ditrigona legnichrysa is a moth in the family Drepanidae. It was described by Wilkinson in 1968. It is found in China and Tibet.

The wingspan is 17.5-19.5 mm for males and 19.5 mm for females. The fore- and hindwings are lustrous white, the forewings with the costa yellowish brown. The fasciae are grey, sub-basal, antemedial, postmedial and three closely opposed subterminal. The hindwings are as the forewings, but the middle subterminal fascia is weak or absent.

References

Moths described in 1968
Drepaninae
Moths of Asia